Espárrago Rock was an IndyRock festival held annually for 15 years, between 1989 and 2003, in the Andalucía region of southern Spain.

Acts performing at the festival included:
 Faith No More - 4 April 1998
 Bad Religion - 5 April 1998
 Dream Theater - 5 April 1998
 Garbage (band) - 12 July 2002 - Beautiful Garbage tour#Beautifulgarbage European Leg
 Iron Maiden - 11 July 2003 - Give Me Ed... 'Til I'm Dead Tour
 Deluxe (musician)
 Cristie
 Sex Museum (band)

References

External links
Spain's Festival Espárrago Rock Attracts Top-Billed Talent Meyer Sound System Provided by Tuabular, meyersound.com
Spanish
http://www.indyrock.es/esparr.htm
 :es:Espárrago Rock

Rock festivals in Spain